Wyangala Dam is a major gated rock fill with clay core embankment and gravity dam with eight radial gates and a concrete chute spillway across the Lachlan River, located in the south-western slopes region of New South Wales, Australia. The dam's purpose includes flood mitigation, hydro-power, irrigation, water supply and conservation. The impounded reservoir is called Lake Wyangala.

Location and features

The dam was built by the New South Wales Water Conservation & Irrigation Commission to supply water for irrigation, flood mitigation and potable water for the towns of Cowra, Forbes, Parkes, Condobolin, Lake Cargelligo, Euabalong and Euabalong West. The dam also provides water for a far larger area and operates in conjunction with Lake Brewster and Lake Cargelligo, to supply water to the lower Lachlan valley customers.

The eight radial gates and concrete chute of the spillway are capable of discharging . A 43 million upgrade of facilities commenced in 2009 and, when completed by 2016, is expected to result in the raising and locking of the spillway radial gates; raising of the spillway chute wall; and raising of the parapet wall crest.

The Wyangala Dam is the second oldest dam built for irrigation in New South Wales and was one of the last dams in the state where a railway or tramway system for construction purposes was utilised. It is the only dam on the Lachlan River system, which feeds the Murrumbidgee River, and in turn feeds the Murray River.

Power generation
A  station was initially constructed below the dam wall and opened in 1947, and the new facility, managed by Hydro Power Pty Ltd, completed in 1992.

History

The name Wyangala is said to originate from an indigenous Wiradjuri word of unknown meaning and is the name of Wyangala Station, one of the properties flooded by Lake Wyangala waters when construction of the dam was completed in 1935. The Wyangala Station homestead site, which was originally settled by the Newham family, is under the water level and can only be seen when the dam is close to being dry. The small settlement of Wyangala, located downstream of the dam wall, was established to house workers during the dam construction.

The current earth and rock wall was constructed between 1961 and 1971 due to fears that the original dam wall was beginning to lift away from its base, and as a result,  would not be able to withstand a major flood. The original dam wall can be seen when the water level is around 30 per cent of the reservoir's catchment capacity.

In 2008, water entitlements were down to just 10 per cent of normal availability. Some inflows to the reservoir later in the year allowed restrictions for high security licence holders to be relaxed. In late 2009, drought had reduced the water storage level to 4.5 per cent of the reservoir's capacity.

The 2022 south eastern Australia floods in late October and early November 2022 resulted in the dam releasing a record /day. The previous record release rate was /day set in 1990.

See also

 Irrigation in Australia - review of irrigation practices used in Australia.
 Lake Cowal - the largest inland lake in New South Wales.
 Dams and Reservoirs - list of dams and reservoirs in NSW.
 Lowbidgee Floodplain - floodplain of the lower Murrumbidgee River.

References

External links
 
 
 

Lachlan River
Dams completed in 1935
Energy infrastructure completed in 1935
Energy infrastructure completed in 1947
Energy infrastructure completed in 1992
Dams in New South Wales
Central West (New South Wales)
Embankment dams
Hydroelectric power stations in New South Wales
Dams in the Murray River basin